Aşk-ı Memnu is the second television series produced in Turkey and the first television miniseries adapted from the eponymous novel by Halid Ziya Uşaklıgil. The first part of the six-part series was released on TRT 1 channel on 19 April 1975.

Cast
Main characters
 Müjde Ar as Bihter Ziyagil
 Salih Güney as Behlül Haznedar
 Neriman Köksal as Firdevs
 Şükran Güngör as Adnan
 Çolpan İlhan as Mademoiselle de Courton
 Murat Erton as Bülent
 Itır Esen as Nihal
 Suna Keskin as Peyker
 Ersin Pertan as Nihat

Episodes
 Melih Bey Takımndan Oluyoruz! 
 Nihal Hanım'ın Çarşafı 
 Çılgınlık Bu Yaptığımız! 
 Gelin Olmak mı? Asla! 
 Behlül'den Sakın! 
 Firdevs Hanım'ın Kızı

External links
 http://www.sinematurk.com/film/7304-ask-i-memnu/

1974 Turkish television series debuts
1970s Turkish television series
Turkish comedy television series
Turkish drama television series
Turkish Radio and Television Corporation original programming